The Neber rearrangement is an organic reaction in which a ketoxime is converted into an alpha-aminoketone via a rearrangement reaction.

The oxime is first converted to an O-sulfonate, for example a tosylate by reaction with tosyl chloride. Added base forms a carbanion which displaces the tosylate group in a nucleophilic displacement to an azirine and added water subsequently hydrolyses it to the aminoketone.

The Beckmann rearrangement is a side reaction.

References

Rearrangement reactions
Name reactions